The 2010 Košice Open was a professional tennis tournament played on outdoor red clay courts. It was part of the 2010 ATP Challenger Tour. It took place in Košice, Slovakia between 7 and 13 June 2010.

ATP entrants

Seeds

 Rankings are as of May 24, 2010.

Other entrants
The following players received wildcards into the singles main draw:
  Mateusz Kowalczyk
  Andrej Martin
  Miloslav Mečíř Jr.
  Martin Přikryl

The following players received entry from the qualifying draw:
  Aleksandr Lobkov
  Jan Minář
  Marek Semjan
  Artem Smirnov

Champions

Singles

 Rubén Ramírez Hidalgo def.  Filip Krajinović 6–3, 6–2

Doubles

 Miloslav Mečíř Jr. /  Marek Semjan def.  Ricardo Hocevar /  Caio Zampieri, 3–6, 6–1, [13–11]

References
Official website
ITF search 

Kosice Open
Kos
Košice Open